Kate Amelia Reed (born 28 September 1982 in Bristol) is a British long-distance runner.

She finished second at the 2006 World University Cross Country Championships and second in the team event at the 2007 European Cross Country Championships. In 2008, she finished twenty-third in the women's 10,000 metres race at the Olympic Games.

Her personal bests are:
1500 metres - 4:13.55 min (2007)
3000 metres - 9:01.17 min (2007)
5000 metres - 15:29.10 min (2007)
10,000 metres - 31:35.77 min (2008)

References

External links
Reed to use BUPA Great Edinburgh run as a stepping stone to Beijing
Tickner and Reed win World Trials

1982 births
Living people
Sportspeople from Bristol
British female long-distance runners
English female long-distance runners
Olympic athletes of Great Britain
Athletes (track and field) at the 2008 Summer Olympics